Anthony John Ardington (born 26 March 1940) is a former first-class cricketer with Oxford University who played in three matches in the 1965 season. He was born in Howick, KwaZulu Natal, South Africa.

Outside cricket he has been a prominent businessman in South Africa.

References 

South African cricketers
Oxford University cricketers
Living people
1940 births
People from Natal
Alumni of Corpus Christi College, Oxford
South African expatriate sportspeople in England